Roger Haugo (born October 11, 1933) is an American lawyer and politician. He served as a Republican member of the South Dakota House of Representatives.

Life and career 
Haugo attended Augustana University and the University of South Dakota. He served in the United States Navy.

Haugo was director of Valley National Bank.

In 1971, Haugo was appointed to the South Dakota House of Representatives, following the resignation of David Billion.

References 

1933 births
Living people
Republican Party members of the South Dakota House of Representatives
20th-century American politicians
Augustana University alumni
University of South Dakota alumni
South Dakota lawyers